de Gerlache is a lunar impact crater that is located along the southern limb of the Moon, within a crater diameter of Shackleton at the south pole. From the Earth this crater is seen from the edge, and it lies in perpetual darkness. Thus little or no detail can be seen of this crater, other than the edge of the rim. However, the crater is clearly visible in Earth-based radar images. The crater is roughly circular, with some slight wear. No craters of note overlie the rim, although some formations may be attached to the southern and western edges.

The crater was identified by Jean-Luc Margot and Donald B. Campbell who jointly proposed the name to the International Astronomical Union. The name, honoring the Belgian explorer Adrien de Gerlache, was adopted by the IAU in 2000.

References

External links 

 

Impact craters on the Moon